Delaware Town is a ghost town in Coshocton County, in the U.S. state of Ohio.

History
The town was so named on account of the site formerly being a Delaware Indian camping ground.

References

Geography of Coshocton County, Ohio